is a Japanese professional baseball player. He was born on September 9, 1990. He debuted in 2013 for the Hokkaido Nippon-Ham Fighters. He had 42 strikeouts.

References

Living people
1990 births
Baseball people from Hokkaido
Chuo University alumni
Japanese baseball players
Nippon Professional Baseball pitchers
Hokkaido Nippon-Ham Fighters players
Yomiuri Giants players